Millicent "Mimi" Edna Goldschmidt (née Cohen) is an American microbiologist. Goldschmidt is known for her pioneering work in the field of astrobiology in addition to her medical research and her contributions to rapid testing methods for detecting microbial contaminants. Goldschmidt is a professor emerita at the University of Texas.

Early life and education

Born June 1, 1926, Goldschmidt grew up in Erie, PA and grew interested in biology when examining her natural surroundings as a girl scout. By age 10, she had decided to become a biologist.

She received a B.A. in 1947 from Case Western Reserve University in concentrated sciences. Though initially discouraged by the amount of memorisation required in undergraduate biology, Goldschmidt pursued it further and became particularly interested in microbiology. She continued on to graduate studies despite resistance from her family; her parents were concerned that this decision would affect her marriage prospects. She obtained her M.S. in 1950 and Ph.D. in 1952, both from Purdue University. Her Ph.D. thesis was entitled Factors Affecting the Oxidation of Acetate by Micrococcus pyogenes var. aureus, completed under the supervision of Dr. Dorothy M. Powelson. Her master's degree project was about penicillin growth, and her findings improved commercial penicillin production yields.

Career and research
After finishing her Ph.D., Goldschmidt worked in Fort Detrick, studying the effect of chemical explosions on microorganisms for George Washington University. 

Next, Goldschmidt moved to Texas. She landed first in Austin for a short postdoctoral fellowship under Orville Wyss, then in Houston. She was hired by Robert Williams at the Baylor College of Medicine. At the time, the Apollo Program aiming to send a manned mission to the moon was underway. One component of the project was to retrieve samples of lunar material to study. Little was known about the composition of lunar material or its potential risk to humans, and protocols needed to be established to contain, preserve, distribute and avoid terrestrial contamination of samples. Goldschmidt was contracted from Baylor to work on the Lunar Receiving Laboratory. She trained the astronauts on how to collect samples without contaminating them and analysed samples for potential biohazards (viruses, bacteria, fungi). The techniques used were time-consuming and inefficient, leading her becoming interested in rapid testing methods. Upon her return to Baylor, she was denied a position by the chair of her department and instead found a position at MD Anderson Medical Center on rapid bacteria detection. She later moved around to various appointments in the Texas Medical Center. Since 1967, she has worked at the University of Texas at Houston as a professor of microbiology. She is passionate about teaching fundamentals to students and has sought to balance a career where she can do research as well as teach and mentor students. At age 85, Goldschmidt retired from an active faculty position, though she remains professor emerita at the University of Houston.

Goldschmidt has developed and presented rapid testing procedures for diagnostic kits. For 30 years, she taught a two-week summer course at Kansas State University on rapid detection methods with a focus on food and cosmetic microbiology. In addition to studying new rapid detection methods, she has reviewed existing kits based on surveys among microbiologists. Her work addresses detection of Candida and Salmonellae.

Another contribution is her later medical research into the microbiological aspects of oral hygiene and facial procedures. Her work has included the considerations of antifungal agents in facial prosthetic silicone, investigations into microbial contamination in denture adhesives, and other studies concerning denture wearers, toothbrushes and toothpastes. 

Goldschmidt has been a member and volunteer of the American Society for Microbiology (ASM) since 1975.

Advocacy

Goldschmidt is a long-time advocate for women in science, both through her mentorship and through her involvement in organisations supporting their career development. She has served as President of the Gulf Chapter of the Association of Women in Science. In 2007, she was appointed to the ASM's Committee on the Status of Women in Microbiology. She initiated the creation of ASM awards for women in microbiology at the postdoctoral level. Goldschmidt has also established an award for female graduate students microbiology, awarded yearly starting in 2012. At UT Houston, her advocacy led to the creation of courses to prevent sexual harassment.

Goldschmidt has also served on the Board of Education and Training of the ASM and remains active on the advisory board for the society's Texas Branch. In 1978, she wrote an article promoting microbiology to students at the secondary level, illustrating the many potential career areas. As part of her involvement with the National Association of Biology Teachers, she took on the role of chairperson of the Texas Outstanding Biology Teacher Award Committee.

Awards and honours
 2020 Sigma Xi fellow "for distinguished scholarship, service to science and society, and for paving the road for women in STEM".
2011 Evan Ferguson Award for service to Sigma Xi.
2011 ASM Founders Distinguished Service Award.
2009 Roche Diagnostics Alice C. Evans Award, a recognition of contributions toward the full participation and advancement of women in microbiology.
2006 Outstanding Alumni, Purdue Department of Biological Sciences.
Fellow of the American Academy of Microbiology.
Lifetime Achievement Award from the Texas Branch of the American Society for Microbiology.

Personal life 
Goldschmidt married Eugene Goldschmidt, who she met while in graduate school. After her marriage and during her pregnancy, her motives in attending graduate school and her commitment to research were questioned by colleagues in the Department of Biological Sciences at Purdue, who suggested that she would not have a productive career. Though she ultimately did follow her husband as he changed jobs, she consistently worked part- or full-time wherever they were located, even while pregnant. Goldschmidt and her husband had two children, born in 1953 and 1956. Eugene Goldschmidt died in 1980.

She is interested in paleontology and collects fossils.

Selected publications 
Goldschmidt is cited either as "Millicent C. Goldschmidt" or "Millicent E. Goldschmidt", based on her maiden name Cohen and middle name Edna.

References

External links 

 

1926 births
Living people
American microbiologists
Women microbiologists
Medical researchers